Miss Universe 2001, the 50th anniversary of the Miss Universe pageant, was held on May 11, 2001, at the Coliseo Rubén Rodríguez in Bayamón, Puerto Rico. Denise Quiñones of Puerto Rico was crowned by Lara Dutta of India as her successor at the end of the event. 77 contestants competed in this year.

Results

Placements

Final Competition Score 

{| class="wikitable sortable collapsible" style="font-size:95%"
! width |Nation
! width |Evening Gown
! width |Swimsuit
! width |Average
|- style="background-color:#FADADD;"
|
|9.74 (1)
|9.61 (1)
|9.68 (1)
|-
|- style="background-color:#eadafd;"
|
|9.66 (2)
|9.45 (2)
|9.56 (2)
|-
|- style="background-color:#ccff99;"
|
|9.45 (4)
|9.37 (3)
|9.41 (3)
|-
|-
|- style="background-color:#ffff99;"
||9.52 (3)
|9.23 (5)
|9.38 (4)
|-
|-
|- style="background-color:#d9eefb;"
||9.35 (6)
|9.28 (4)
|9.32 (5)
|-
|-
||9.41 (5)
|9.16 (6)
|9.29 (6)
|-
||9.33 (7)
|9.10 (7)
|9.22 (7)
|-
||9.26 (8)
|9.03 (9)
|9.15 (8)
|-
||9.14 (9)
|9.00 (10)
|9.07 (9)
|-
||8.99 (10)
|9.10 (7)
|9.05 (10)
|}

 Winner
 First Runner-up
 Second Runner-up
 Third Runner-up
 Fourth Runner-up
 Top 10 Semifinalist
(#) Rank in each round of competition

Contestants
77 contestants competed for the title.

Notes

Awards
  - Miss Congeniality (Nakera Simms)
  - Miss Photogenic (Denise Quiñones)
  - Best National Costume (Kim Sa-rang)

Returns

Last competed in 1979:

  Last competed in 1999:

          Other notes
 The Parade of Nations followed the 1989 pageant in continental format and the delegates wore their national costumes.
 Poland was supposed to be represented by the 1st runner-up of Miss Polonia, Malgorzata Rozniecka. Studies prevented her from going, and the organization picked another finalist, Monika Gruda. Later in September, Malgorzata Rozniecka won the Miss International pageant in Japan.
 France, Élodie Gossuin who would later win Miss Europe, faced controversy when it was rumoured that she was a transsexual,until a medical examination confirmed that she was a natural-born woman.Cyber-row as Miss France gets 'man' label
 The organization invited Miss Russia 2001, Oxana Fedorova, to attend the pageant, but she was unable to compete due to studies and vowed to participate in 2002. Her 1st runner-up, Oxana Kalandyrets, competed instead and became a top 10 finalist. Fedorova would go on to win the following year's Miss Universe pageant, only to be dethroned and replaced with her runner-up four months later. Kalandyrets sported the same evening gown that the Russian representative at Miss Universe 1997, Anna Baytchik, wore during Miss Universe 1997 preliminaries.
 Miss Spain 2001, Lorena van Heerde Ayala, could not compete in the pageant because she was underage (17 at the time). Her 1st runner-up, Eva Sisó, replaced her. Lorena was supposed then to compete in Miss Universe 2002 as well, but after a threat of lawsuit against the Miss España Organization by her family side due to the breach of contract by the organization, she cut all ties with the Miss España organization and lost the right to represent Spain in any international pageant.
 Juliana Borges of Brazil''' was heavily criticized after openly admitting to the media that she had undergone nineteen plastic surgeries, stating "It's like studying for a math exam and you get good grades... you study and you work hard to have the perfect body". Despite a public outcry she was still allowed to compete.
Miss Vietnam 2000 Phan Thu Ngân was invited to participate the competition but she declined and married afterwards.

References

2001
2001 in Puerto Rico
2001 beauty pageants
Beauty pageants in Puerto Rico
Bayamón, Puerto Rico
May 2001 events in North America